James Slusser (born 1916) was a longtime Pittsburgh police leader who served as Pittsburgh Police Chief from August 13, 1952-January 5, 1970. He joined the force in 1941.

After retiring, Slusser became the first director of the Allegheny County Police Training Academy at suburban North Park from 1971 until at least early 1975.

See also

 Police chief
 Allegheny County Sheriff
 List of law enforcement agencies in Pennsylvania

References

External links

Chiefs of the Pittsburgh Bureau of Police
1916 births
Year of death missing